Alley: The Return of the Ying Yang Twins is the second studio album by American rap duo Ying-Yang Twins from Atlanta, Georgia. It was released on March 26, 2002 via Koch Records. The album debuted at #79 on the Billboard 200 and peaked at #58 two weeks later. The album also sold over 400,000 copies in the US.

Track listing

Charts

Weekly charts

Year-end charts

References

External links

2002 albums
Ying Yang Twins albums
Albums produced by Mr. Collipark
E1 Music albums